"Senzeni Na?" (also spelled Senzenina) is a South African anti‐apartheid folk song. It is a Xhosa struggle song, and is commonly sung at funerals, demonstrations and in churches. Activist Duma Ndlovu compared the influence of "Senzeni Na?" to that of the American protest song, "We Shall Overcome."

The song has been around at least since the 1950s, and it reached the height of its popularity during the 1980s.  The origins of the song are unclear.  Zimbabwean poet Albert Nyathi wrote a song by the same title, "Senzeni Na?" on the day that activist Chris Hani died.

The song was among several songs of a more mournful nature that became popular among anti-apartheid activists in the 1960s. The song repeats the line "What have we done" a number of times, which musician Sibongile Khumalo has described as giving the listener a sense of desolation.

Lyrics
There does not seem to be one universally agreed on set of lyrics. Below are two versions, the bottom one being the more aggressive of the two:

Appearances in the Western world
While best known in South Africa, "Senzeni Na?" has gained some popularity overseas. The song was featured in the anti‐apartheid film The Power of One as well as during the opening credits of the film In My Country, and a recording of the song as sung at the funeral of Steve Biko can be heard at the end of the album version of "Biko" by Peter Gabriel. The music was used for an adaptation of the hymn "When I Survey the Wondrous Cross" by Isaac Watts in the Mennonite Hymnal: A Worship Book.

In Kim Stanley Robinson's Mars trilogy there is a city called Senzeni Na (founded by the Japanese). Part 7 of the book is also titled "Senzeni Na."

References

Songs against racism and xenophobia
South African folk songs
Anti-apartheid songs